Barengo (Piedmontese and Lombard: Barengh) is a comune (municipality) in the Province of Novara in the Italian region Piedmont, located about  northeast of Turin and about  northwest of Novara.

Barengo borders the following municipalities: Briona, Cavaglietto, Cavaglio d'Agogna, Fara Novarese, Momo, and Vaprio d'Agogna.

The footballer Giampiero Boniperti was born in Barengo.

References

Cities and towns in Piedmont